Hussain Al-Romaihi (born 12 September 1974) is a retired Qatari footballer who played for Qatar SC as a goalkeeper. He also previously played for the Qatar national team.

He was appointed as director of football for Qatar SC in December 2014.

Career
Al-Romaihi played for Qatar SC since he was 12 years old, earning more than 200 caps for the senior team to make him one of the highest capped players of all time for Qatar SC. He was also capped 38 times by the Qatar national team between 2000 and 2007. He also represented Qatar at the 1991 FIFA U-17 World Championship.

His talents were first discovered by the youth coach of Qatar SC, Ahmed Abdul-Azim.

Club career statistics
Statistics accurate as of 10 February 2012

2Includes Sheikh Jassem Cup.
3Includes AFC Champions League.

See also
List of one-club men

References

External links
 
 
 

1974 births
Living people
Qatar SC players
Qatari footballers
Qatar Stars League players
Qatar international footballers
Association football goalkeepers
2000 AFC Asian Cup players